"Lover, Come Back to Me" is a popular song composed by Sigmund Romberg with lyrics by Oscar Hammerstein II for the Broadway show The New Moon, where the song was introduced by Evelyn Herbert and Robert Halliday (as Robert Misson). The song was published in 1928.

Film versions
The song was performed by Lawrence Tibbett and Grace Moore in New Moon, the 1930 film adaptation of The New Moon, and by Jeanette MacDonald and Nelson Eddy in the 1940 adaptation, also titled New Moon.

Barbra Streisand version

Arranged and conducted by George Williams, the song was released as Barbra Streisand's second single in November 1962 as a double single with "My Coloring Book".

Produced by Mike Berniker, and recorded before Streisand's first album sessions, the single was sent to radio.

In 1963, Streisand re-recorded the song for her second album The Second Barbra Streisand Album, which appeared on the compilation The Essential Barbra Streisand. In her first television special, My Name is Barbra, she performed a bitterly jubilant version of the song. In 2000, she performed the song on her Timeless Tour and a live recording was included on the live album Timeless: Live in Concert and the DVD.

Billie Holiday versions
 "Lover, Come Back to Me" (1944 version)
 "Lover, Come Back To Me" (1952 Clef Records)

Streisand versions
 "Lover, Come Back To Me" (1962 version)
 "Lover, Come Back To Me" (1963 Version) / (album version) - 2:18
 "Lover, Come Back To Me" (live from Timeless: Live in Concert, 2000)
 "Medley: Hooray For Love / After You've Gone / By Myself / S'Wonderful / (I Like New York In June) How About You? / Lover, Come Back To Me / You And The Night And The Music / It All Depends On You" (Live from The Judy Garland Show) - 4:34

Other notable recordings
 
 Peggy Lee (Miss Wonderful 1944-1955 released 2009)
 Arden-Ohman Orchestra (Victor, 1929). Joel Whitburn estimates this recording would have charted at No. 6 if the Billboard Hot 100 had existed.
 Paul Whiteman and his Orchestra (Columbia, 1929). Joel Whitburn estimates this recording would have charted at No. 3 if the Billboard Hot 100 had existed.
 Perry Askam (Victor, 1930). Joel Whitburn estimates this recording would have charted at No. 20 if the Billboard Hot 100 had existed.
 Mildred Bailey – recorded for Vocalion Records in 1938.
 Nat King Cole – a single in 1953 which reached the Billboard charts peaking at No. 16.
 Barbara Cook – Oscar Winners: The Lyrics of Oscar Hammerstein II (1997)
 Ella Fitzgerald – Sweet and Hot (1955)
 Chet Atkins and Les Paul - Chester & Lester - (RCA Victor, 1976)
 Django Reinhardt with Larry Adler - recorded together the song twice in May 1938
 Mel Torme, John Coltrane, Sun Ra, Lester Young, Art Pepper, Count Basie, Joe Williams, Brian Ferry

Usage
 The Annette Hanshaw rendition of this song was also used in the animated movie, Sita Sings The Blues.

See also
List of 1920s jazz standards

References

External links
Lover Come Back to Me at jazzstandards.com

1928 songs
1920s jazz standards
1959 singles
Songs with music by Sigmund Romberg
Songs with lyrics by Oscar Hammerstein II
Barbra Streisand songs
Ella Fitzgerald songs
Mildred Bailey songs
Nat King Cole songs
Billie Holiday songs
Ed Townsend songs
Capitol Records singles
Columbia Records singles
Jazz compositions in F major
Jeanette MacDonald songs